James White (2 December 1861 – 14 July 1918) was an Australian sculptor, winner of the Wynne Prize in 1902.

Early life 
White was born in Liverpool, Lancashire, England, the son of Robert White, journeyman shipwright, and his wife Janet, née Dunn. White was apprenticed to a plasterer and studied modelling at South Kensington. White made anatomical models for hospitals in London.

Australian period 

White came to Sydney around 1884 and worked for Achille Simonetti on the monument to Governor Arthur Phillip in Sydney Botanical Gardens. White won the Wynne Prize for the group 'In Defence of the Flag' at Sydney in 1902.

Despite a long list of commissions, White was by no means a distinguished sculptor. White came to Australia when there were few sculptors there of ability, and it must be presumed that his sketch models were better than his finished works, as in later years he more than once obtained important commissions in competition with better men.

Later life 
White died of cancer while visiting Brisbane and was buried in Toowong Cemetery. He was survived by his wife, son and two daughters.

Selected works 
White executed a large number of statues and memorials in Australia, including the Queen Victoria memorial (1907) and the Fitzgibbon statue at Melbourne, statues of George Bass, Daniel Henry Deniehy, Sir John Robertson and William Bede Dalley at Sydney, the John McDouall Stuart statue at Adelaide, South African war memorials at Perth and Ballarat and statues of Queen Victoria and George Lansell at Bendigo. White's head of an Australian aboriginal is in the collection of the Art Gallery of New South Wales.

References

Additional resources listed by the Australian Dictionary of Biography:
K. Scarlett, Australian Sculptors (Melb, 1980)
Australasian Builder and Contractor's News, 12 Nov 1892, p 238
All About Australians, 2 Mar 1903
Australasian Art Review, 1 Apr 1899, p 20, 1 July 1899, pp 18, 21, 1 Sept 1899, p 12
Lone Hand, Aug 1907, p 380
Observer (Adelaide), 21 Nov 1903
Sydney Morning Herald, 11 May 1904
Advertiser (Adelaide), 6 June 1904
Age (Melbourne), 25 May 1907
Argus (Melbourne), 27 Sept, 29 Nov 1910, 20 July 1918, and camera supplement, 1 Dec 1928
Annual exhibition catalogues, Art Society of New South Wales, 1892, 1894, and Society of Artists, 1896, 1897

External links
 AGNSW collection record of White's Queensland Aboriginal Man 1897

1861 births
1918 deaths
Deaths from cancer in Queensland
Burials at Toowong Cemetery
English emigrants to Australia
Wynne Prize winners
20th-century Australian sculptors
19th-century Australian sculptors